London Irish is an English rugby union club.

London Irish may also refer to:

London Irish Amateur, an amateur rugby union club affiliated to London Irish
London Irish Rifles, a former volunteer rifle regiment of the British Army, now part of the London Regiment
London Irish (TV series), a 2013 sitcom TV series about young Irish people living in London
Irish people in London; see Ethnic groups in London#Irish